Codsall railway station is a railway station which serves the village of Codsall in Staffordshire, England.

History

The original listed GWR footbridge, between the two platforms and which dated from 1883, was accidentally destroyed by contractors using a road-rail crane in June 2005. Five of the original cast iron columns have been damaged beyond repair. The replacement replica columns were cast at Barr and Grosvenor's foundry in Wolverhampton during 2007. Approximately 70% of the original wrought iron span was found to be salvageable for reuse in the replacement which has been rebuilt a little higher than the original to comply with current regulations.

The GWR signal box stood slightly to the east of Codsall station. It was taken out of use and control of the area passed to Madeley Junction as a result of the 2006 resignalling scheme. The lever and locking frame from the signal box were recovered by Network Rail for re-use in the south-west of England. The remaining re-usable parts of the signal box have been relocated to the Dean Forest Railway.

The station house on the westbound platform has undergone a renovation in recent years and is now home to a CAMRA award-winning public house known as The Station. This opened in 1999 under the licence of Holdens Brewery.

Facilities
The station is unstaffed, and has the basic facilities that can be expected at a station of its type. There is a ticket machine on platform 1 and covered waiting areas, help and assistance points and dot matrix departure boards on both platforms.

Services

Codsall is typically served by one train per hour, every day of the week, in each direction between Birmingham New Street and Shrewsbury via Wolverhampton, which calls at all local stations en route. There's also an additional service in each direction in the morning and evening peak. Most services are operated by West Midlands Trains, with one Transport for Wales service a day Monday-Saturday and two on Sundays. West Midlands Railway operate these services using British Rail Class 170 Diesel Multiple Units and British Rail Class 196 Diesel Multiple Units.

References

Further reading

External links

South Staffordshire District
Railway stations in Staffordshire
DfT Category F2 stations
Former Great Western Railway stations
Railway stations in Great Britain opened in 1849
Railway stations served by West Midlands Trains
Railway stations served by Transport for Wales Rail
1849 establishments in England